Marché de La Viande is a market in Nouakchott, Mauritania. It is located just to the southwest of Mosque Ould Abas.

References

Retail markets in Mauritania
Nouakchott